Ownership unbundling is the process by which a company is divested of some of its asset via legislation. This is often done to break up monopolies. Vertically integrated businesses are often ownership unbundled to achieve more competitive markets. The First Railway Directive and Third Energy Package in the EU both have this as their aims.

Monopoly (economics)